E18 or E-18 may refer to:
 E18 error, a Canon digital camera error code
 County Route E18 (California), a County route in California
 DRG Class E 18, a class of German electric locomotives
 European route E18, a non-continuous road and ferry route in the United Kingdom and Fennoscandia
 E18, a postcode district in the E postcode area of London
 HMS E18, a submarine of the Royal Navy
 E18 Album, an album by the band 
 Enlightenment (software) version 0.18, a window manager
 Jōshin-etsu Expressway, route E18 in Japan
 Kajang Dispersal Link Expressway, route E18 in Malaysia